Patrik Augusta (born November 13, 1969 in Jihlava, Czechoslovakia) is a retired Czech ice hockey winger. He played 4 games in the National Hockey League with the Toronto Maple Leafs and Washington Capitals between 1994 and 1998. The rest of his career, which lasted from 1988 to 2006, was primarily spent in the minor leagues and later in the German Deutsche Eishockey Liga. Internationally Augusta played for the Czechoslovak national team at the 1992 Winter Olympics and 1992 World Championship, winning a bronze medal in each tournament. After retiring from play Augusta turned to coaching, working for teams in the Czech Republic.

Playing career
Augusta was drafted 149th overall by the Toronto Maple Leafs in the 1992 NHL Entry Draft and played two games for the Leafs and two games for the Washington Capitals. He played in the IHL with the Long Beach Ice Dogs and then the Deutsche Eishockey Liga in which he has played for the Schwenningen Wild Wings, Krefeld Penguins and now the Hannover Scorpions, a club he has played on since the 2003–04 season. After the 2005–06 season, he announced his retirement. After working for 2 years as a European Scout for Phoenix Coyotes, he worked as a Sport Manager for team Dukla Jihlava. From 2009 he started his coaching career as an assistant coach for Dukla Jihlava.

He played on the bronze medal winning ice hockey team for Czechoslovakia at the 1992 Winter Olympics.
Also played on the bronze medal team at 1992 World Championship in Prague.
Was on the 1991 Czechoslovakia Elite League winning team Dukla Jihlava and 2003 DEL - Deutsche Eishockey Liga winning team Krefeld Pinguine.

Post-playing career
In 2012, he became a Head Coach in Dukla Jihlava Ice Hockey Academy, coaching teams U16, U18 and U20. Also worked as Assistant Coach with U16, U17 and U18 Czech National Team at U18 World Championship in Grand Forks.

His father Josef Augusta, who won a silver medal for Czechoslovakia at the 1976 Winter Olympics and was a three-time gold medal winner as a Coach for team Czech Republic at the World Championships in 1999, 2000 and 2001, died on February 16, 2017.

Career statistics

Regular season and playoffs

International

References

External links
 

1969 births
Living people
Arizona Coyotes scouts
Czech expatriate ice hockey players in Canada
Czech expatriate ice hockey players in Germany
Czech expatriate ice hockey players in the United States
Czech ice hockey left wingers
Czechoslovak Extraliga players
Czechoslovak ice hockey left wingers
Hannover Scorpions players
HC Dukla Jihlava players
Ice hockey players at the 1992 Winter Olympics
Krefeld Pinguine players
Long Beach Ice Dogs (IHL) players
Los Angeles Ice Dogs players
Medalists at the 1992 Winter Olympics
Olympic bronze medalists for Czechoslovakia
Olympic ice hockey players of Czechoslovakia
Olympic medalists in ice hockey
Sportspeople from Jihlava
St. John's Maple Leafs players
Schwenninger Wild Wings players
Toronto Maple Leafs draft picks
Toronto Maple Leafs players
Washington Capitals players
Czech ice hockey coaches